Jason Joseph Johnson (born February 6, 1974) is a former American football center who played three seasons with the Indianapolis Colts of the National Football League. He played college football at Kansas State University and attended Oak Park High School in Kansas City, Missouri.

References

External links
Just Sports Stats
Fanbase profile

Living people
1974 births
Players of American football from Kansas City, Missouri
American football centers
Kansas State Wildcats football players
Indianapolis Colts players
People from Gladstone, Missouri